Static Prevails is the second studio album by American rock band Jimmy Eat World, released on July 23, 1996, through Capitol Records. Following the release of the band's self-titled debut album (1994), they signed to Capitol in mid-1995 for further releases. Carrier member Rick Burch replaced bassist Mitch Porter, who left to become a Mormon missionary. Recorded at Sound City in Los Angeles, California, and at Big Fish, in Encinitas, California, Wes Kidd, Mark Trombino, and Jimmy Eat World acted as producers for the album.

Static Prevails saw the band move away from skate punk and pop-punk, and into a more aggressive sound consisting of post-hardcore, emo and punk rock. Preceded by a three-month United States tour, it was promoted with a mini tour of the country, a stint with the Smoking Popes and the Figgs, and a US tour with Sense Field in early 1997. A music video was filmed for "Rockstar", and "Call It in the Air" was released as the lead single in August 1996. The album received mixed reviews from music critics, who mostly commented on the vocals and guitarwork. It has since been viewed as a benchmark for the second wave of emo.

Background and development
Jimmy Eat World released their self-titled debut studio album in 1994, through local label Wooden Blue records. As the members left high school, frontman Jim Adkins was part of a production company with Joel Leibow, co-founder of Wooden Blue. The production company listed itself in Maximumrocknroll guide Book Your Own Fuckin' Life, which assisted bands, promoters, and venues to book shows across the United States. After being contacted by Christie Front Drive for a show, Leibow asked the band to do a split single with Jimmy Eat World. Various major labels contacted the band and asked for a tape of their music. Loren Isreal, a talent scout from Capitol Records went to a show to check out Sense Field; however, the opening act, Christie Front Drive, caught his attention. Isreal asked them if they had new material he could hear, with the band responding by mentioning they had released a split with Jimmy Eat World.

Sometime later, Jimmy Eat World played a benefit show; a staff member at Capitol was in the audience, and approached them. In mid-1995, they signed a development deal with the label that included one album, with the possibility for six more. As the band did not know any entertainment lawyers, they hired Lind's family attorney to gloss over the contract. Around this time, bassist Mitch Porter became a Mormon missionary at the insistence of his family, and left the band. Carrier bassist Rick Burch, who guitarist Tom Linton had been best friends with since the seventh grade, replaced Porter. Capitol set up the band to record demos for their next album with Jon Auer of the Posies in Seattle, Washington. They then visited Capitol's A&R person Craig Aaronson at his house in Los Angeles, California, where they showed him the demos they had done. Aaronson was discussing the band's songwriting process, which he felt made no sense; Adkins explained they used to write songs as a series of "cool part[s]" one after another.

Recording and production
When Jimmy Eat World was searching for an engineer to record Static Prevails, they came across former Drive Like Jehu member Mark Trombino. The band recorded two songs with him, "Opener" and "77 Satellites", both of which were released through record label An Industry for Outer Space on 7" vinyl. At Capitol's insistence, Jimmy Eat World went to a rehearsal room in Los Angeles, having been told to write some new songs and rewrite others, being guided by a producer they had hired. The band did pre-production at Mind's Eye Digital in Mesa, Arizona, with engineer Larry Elyea. Static Prevails was recorded in 1995 at Sound City in Los Angeles, and at Big Fish in Encinitas, California. While Jimmy Eat World wanted Trombino to produce the album, Capitol insisted on the production duo of Tom Rothrock and Rob Schnapf, who had previously produced for the likes of Foo Fighters and Beck. The label eventually relented, with Jimmy Eat World working with Trombino, and Wes Kidd of labelmates Triple Fast Action; the band were also given a producer credit.

Billy Bowers and Jeff Sheehan served as assistant engineers at Sound City. When Jimmy Eat World recorded Seventeen", it initially featured the chorus line "You're only seventeen"; however, when they realized it sounded too similar to a song by Winger, Linton changed the lyrics, and the band re-recorded it. Trombino, who also acted as engineer, mixed all of the tracks, apart from "Rockstar" and "Seventeen", in Studio C at Capitol Studios. Peter Doell, Billy Smith, and Steve Genewick worked as assistant engineers at Capitol. Rothrock and Schnapf mixed "Rockstar" and "Seventeen" at Sunset Sound, with Cappy Japngie serving as an assistant engineer. Captiol Records insisted on Rothrock and Schnapf mixing the tracks because the label planned to send them to alternative radio stations; subsequently, the vocals on both tracks ended up high in the mix. Stephen Marcussen mastered all of the recordings at Precision Mastering, while Craig Aaronson served as the executive producer.

Composition

Static Prevails marked a shift from Jimmy Eat World's previous skate punk material in the vein of NOFX, Rocket from the Crypt, and J Church, into aggressive but melodic post-hardcore, emo, and punk rock, by bands such as Seam, Tortoise, and Sunny Day Real Estate. Drummer Zach Lind attributed this change in style to listening to Christie Front Drive, who they found to be "really melodic but still very powerful". Lind played in a more aggressive and noisier style of rock-oriented drumming, with elements of his punk roots. Static Prevails splits lead vocals almost evenly between Linton and Adkins, which contrasted from the Linton-dominated Jimmy Eat World, where Adkins only sung lead on one track. Ted Simon compared Adkins' vocals to those of the Replacements' frontman Paul Westerberg. In addition to playing the drums, Lind played the accordion and the concertina. Tracks such as "Seventeen", "Digits" and "Robot Factory" are reminiscent of releases on indie labels like Homestead and Twin/Tone Records.

Eric Richter of Christie Front Drive provided additional vocals on "Digits", while Kidd played an acoustic guitar on "Claire", Lind's ex-girlfriend Sarah Pont played violin, and Trombino contributed on the Moog synthesizer. The opening track, "Thinking, That's All", and "Call It in the Air" are screamo-esque songs, the former channeling the sound of Unwound. Linton said Adkins came up with the basic form of "Thinking, That's All", which the other members added to. The band had been playing "Rockstar" live for sometime, prior to signing with Capitol, with Linton often mumbling his speech as he had no lyrics for it. It was only during the demo session with Auer that he wrote the words, as the label thought it was a hit-sounding song. "Claire" evokes Texas Is the Reason with its quiet and loud sections, aided by a violin. Lind said the song was "formative" for the band, as it showed them that a simplistic arrangement can "make something [sound] cool". Linton said they took influence for it from Sunny Day Real Estate, particularly their song "In Circles" (1994), while Adkins the lyrics were "very journal entry-ish".

"Call It in the Air", with its punk-esque sound, earned a comparison to Sense Field. Lind said it exemplified the band's punk roots. Lind said the opening drum part to "Seventeen" intentionally ripped off Drove Like Jehu, to the annoyance of Trombino. "Episode IV" is the first track the band wrote without any "loud, saturated guitar sounds", according to Adkins. He came up with the basic structure, which he showed to Linton, who thought it had a sound akin to "Hurt" (1994) by Nine Inch Nails. Linton opted to whisper his vocals instead of singing to "keep it a really delicate song". "Digits" was influenced by the work of Christie Front Drive; an earlier version of it was released on Jimmy Eat World's split with Christie Front Drive. "Caveman" features the sound of crickets throughout its length, which was achieved by taking a Neumann U67 microphone outside Big Fish Studios. For sometime, Linton struggled with the song's lyrics; he only came up with them while in the bathroom at the studio "looking at aerosol cans and trying to find some rhythming words to match the verse".

The band used to open their shows with "World Is Static" as it would shift direction partway through. Alongside this, Adkins said they were employing choruses more often as they found enjoyment in repetition. The drums in it were inspired by John Anderson, the drummer of Boys Life. Staff members at Capitol asked Linton to tell Adkins to stop screaming as he was doing it for the majority of "World Is Static": "I was like, 'Yeah, I can't tell him that, because he'll just scream louder. Burch compared the hushed atmosphere of "In the Same Room" to falling snow. When mixing the song, Adkins said him and Trombino recorded radio static for its beginning, which Trombino compressed to make it sit around the vocals. The title of "Robot Factory" comes from a power plant in the McClintock area of Tempe, Arizona. The closing track, "Anderson Mesa", features a string arrangement; its title references the observatory of the same name. Adkins said it was about him living in Flagstaff, Arizona, where he previously attended college prior to dropping out.

Release and promotion
After the band handed in Static Prevails, the staff at Capitol were "bummed [...] Just guys being like, 'Uh ... this is a lot different than what we expected'", according to Linton. Jimmy Eat World toured the West Coast of the US in anticipation of the album between May and July 1996. Capitol released Static Prevails on July 23, 1996. The cover artwork features a sideways photo of chimneys, taken on a rooftop in Denver, Colorado, by Paul Drake. The original vinyl version featured different artwork, and included the bonus 7" vinyl of "In the Same Room" and "77 Satellites". The band made a music video for "Rockstar", which was included on some copies of the CD version of the album as enhanced content. It was filmed at Koo's Cafe, a DIY venue in Santa Ana, Calfironia, with directors Richard and Stefanie Reines of Drive-Thru Records.

Capitol released "Call It in the Air" as the lead single on August 26, 1996 on a 7" vinyl, with "Rockstar" as the B-side. Jimmy Eat World promoted Static Prevails with a mini US tour along the West; later, the band embarked on the God Bless America tour with the Smoking Popes and the Figgs. In February 1997, Jimmy Eat World embarked on a cross-country US tour with Sense Field. Capitol felt the original version of "Seventeen" would work in the film Never Been Kissed (1999), and in return for letting the label use it in the film, the band met Drew Barrymore. Adkins felt the lyrics of the original tied in well with the lead character of the movie. Along with their third studio Clarity (1999), Static Prevails was re-released in 2007; "77 Satellites" and "What Would I Say to You Now" were included as bonus tracks. Static Prevails, along with Clarity and their fifth studio Futures (2004), was re-pressed on vinyl in 2014.

Reception

Static Prevails was met with mixed reviews from music critics. AllMusic reviewer Mike DaRonco stated that "what Static Prevails essentially lacks is the songwriting maturity that Jimmy Eat World could have perfected; but it's almost as if the studio heads at Capitol wouldn't let them so that there would be more room for radio-friendly pop songs. In the end, nobody won." Harry Guerin of RTÉ found it to be "largely a textbook emo record" that "never really keeps your attention throughout". According to him, the album has "too many instances of familiar sounding riffs and overwrought vocals [...] to be convincing". The staff at The New Rolling Stone Album Guide called it "very much of its time", complete with "anxiety-ridden vocals, lyrics of suburban melodrama, and screaming punk guitars".

BBC Music writer Tim Nelson opened his review asking if the album title was "presumably meant ironically", as "staying still is one thing this propulsive pop album [...] doesn't do." In his eyes, the music "crosses the abyss between indie indulgence and soul-sucking corporate pap with aplomb". Barbara Restaino of Lollipop Magazine said that she though she would "really like it" to begin with, however, Adkins and Linton's voices "started to annoy me" after a while.

Michael Carriere viewed Static Prevails and Clarity as landmarks in the second wave of emo. In 2012, Jason Heller of The A.V. Club noted, "As with so many punk bands that signed to a major during that decade, Jimmy Eat World gained precious few new fans—and lost many old ones—with Static Prevails." Coinciding with the album's 25th anniversary, Bandbox and Captiol Records released a version of the album with an accompanying booklet written by Alex Rice. He highlighted five songs from the band's catalogue – "Believe in What You Want" from Clarity, "Bleed American" from Bleed American (2001), "Futures" from their fifth studio album Futures (2004), "Action Needs an Audience" from their seventh studio album Invented (2010), and "Pol Roger" from their ninth studio album Integrity Blues (2016) – that drew influence from Static Prevails. Louder writer Alistair Lawrence said songs like "Claire" and "Digits" "create something uneven but distinct, which would unintentionally form part of the roadmap for emo's rite of passage through the late '90s". Andrew Sacher of BrooklynVegan felt that "Claire" was the "earliest example of what Jimmy Eat World would achieve artistically" with Clarity.

Track listing
All songs written by Jimmy Eat World. All recordings produced by Wes Kidd, Mark Trombino, and Jimmy Eat World.

Personnel
Personnel per booklet.

Jimmy Eat World
 Tom Linton – guitar, co-lead vocals
 Jim Adkins – guitar, co-lead vocals
 Zach Lind – drums, accordion, concertina
 Rick Burch – bass guitar

Additional musicians
 Eric Richter – additional vocals (track 7)
 Sarah Pont – violin
 Mark Trombino – Moog
 Wes Kidd – acoustic guitar (track 3)

Production
 Wes Kidd – producer
 Mark Trombino – producer, engineer, mixing (all except tracks 2 and 5)
 Jimmy Eat World – producer
 Tom Rothrock – mixing (tracks 2 and 5)
 Rob Schnapf – mixing (tracks 2 and 5)
 Billy Bowers – assistant engineer
 Jeff Sheehan – assistant engineer
 Peter Doell – assistant engineer
 Billy Smith – assistant engineer
 Steve Genewick – assistant engineer
 Cappy Japngie – assistant engineer
 Larry Elyea – engineer
 Stephen Marcussen – mastering
 Craig Aaronson – executive producer
 Paul Drake – cover photography, ambient band
 Andy Mueller – smiley band photo
 Jim Adkins – other photos
 Ohiogirlco – design, art direction

References
Citations

Sources

External links

 Static Prevails (bonus track version) at YouTube (streamed copy where licensed)

1996 albums
Jimmy Eat World albums
Capitol Records albums
Albums produced by Mark Trombino
Post-hardcore albums by American artists
Punk rock albums by American artists